Hard is a quarter in the district 4 of Zürich. It was formerly a part of Aussersihl municipality, which was incorporated into Zürich in 1893. The quarter has a population of 12,715 distributed on an area of 1.46 km² (as of 2009).

Points of interest 
Swissmill is the largest mill in Switzerland that operates 800 tons of grain. Although the silo's exterior and height is disputed, the municipal authorities claim that the silo is intentionally designed in its aesthetically conscious way. Its external appearance is intended to express its interior –  an industrial plant.

References

External links 

District 4 of Zürich
Former municipalities of the canton of Zürich